Ciderius is an extinct genus of jawless fish in the family Euphaneropidae. It is known from the Lower Silurian of Scotland.

References

External links 
 

Anaspidomorphi genera
Fossil taxa described in 2015